Acton Vale is an industrial town in southcentral Quebec, Canada. It is the seat of the Acton Regional County Municipality and is in the Montérégie administrative region. Its population in the Canada 2021 Census was 7,605. The town covers an area of 90.96 km (35 sq. mi.).

By road, Acton Vale is 100 km (60 mi.) from the province's largest city, Montreal, and 190 km (120 mi.) from the province's capital, Quebec City. It is also 100 km (60 mi.) from the border with the United States.

History

While the Township of Acton was proclaimed in 1806, it wasn't until 1850 when the area opened up for settlement due to the construction of the railroad. Incorporated in 1861, the town was named for Acton, a suburb of London, England. The name means "oak town." The town was once a centre for copper mining. Between 1860 and 1875, the Acton copper mine was one of the most important copper mines in the world, but the deposits were quickly depleted.

On January 26, 2000, the parish municipality of Saint-André-d'Acton was merged into the Town of Acton Vale.

Communities
Beside Acton Vale is Lavoie, a community in the south of the municipality, accessible by Highway 139.

Demographics 

Government

The mayor is Éric Charbonneau.

List of former mayors

 Éric Charbonneau (2009 - )
 Juliette Dupuis (2005 - 2009)
 Maurice Coutu (2001-2005)
 Anatole Bergeron (1993-2001)
 Gaston Gigère (????-1993)
 Roger Labrèque (1974-1986)
 Henri Boisvert (1966-1974)
 J.Edmour Gagnon (1963-1966)
 Lucien Désautels (1962-1963)
 Roger Labrèque (1948-1962)
 J.W. Cantin (1942-1948)
 J. Antonio Leclerc (1940-1942)
 Dr Philippe Adam (1934-1940)
 Ernest Boisvert (1932-1933)
 Auray Fontaine (1928-1932)
 Ernest Boisvert (1926-1928)
 Auray Fontaine (1924-1926)
 Dr. Léon Gauthier (1922-1924)
 J.E. Marcile (1918-1922)
 Dr. F.H. Daigneault (1916-1918)
 Charles Viens (1915-1916)
 David Lemay (1914-1915)
 Dr. F.H. Daigneault (1905-1914)
 Pierre Guertin (1902-1905)
 Georges Deslandes (1901-1902)
 J.E. Marcile (1900-1901)
 Milton McDonald (1897-1900)
 Auguste Dalpé (1896-1897)
 Alfred Saint-Amour (1895-1896)
 Pierre Guertin (1893-1895)
 Alfred Saint-Amour (1891-1893)
 Charles Roscony (1881-1891)
 N.H Dubois (1880-1881)
 Charles Roscony (1872-1880)
 Jérémie Morrier (1870-1872)
 J.A. Cushing (1868-1870)
 Charles F. McCallum (1866-1868)
 Jérémie Morrier (1864-1866)
 A.H. Dubrule (1863-1864)
 J.A. Cushing (1861-1863)

Media
La Pensée de Bagot  is the local newspaper for Acton Vale and the region.

Notable people
Kevin Asselin, born 1985, professional ice hockey player

See also
Municipal history of Quebec
List of cities in Quebec

References

External links

Acton Vale Official Web Site
Acton Regional County Municipality Official Web Site

Cities and towns in Quebec
Incorporated places in Acton Regional County Municipality
1862 establishments in Canada